In mathematics, the Dirichlet–Jordan test gives sufficient conditions for a real-valued, periodic function f to be equal to the sum of its Fourier series at a point of continuity. Moreover, the behavior of the Fourier series at points of discontinuity is determined as well (it is the midpoint of the values of the discontinuity). It is one of many conditions for the convergence of Fourier series.

The original test was established by Peter Gustav Lejeune Dirichlet in 1829, for piecewise monotone functions. It was extended in the late 19th century by Camille Jordan to functions of bounded variation (any function of bounded variation is the difference of two increasing functions).

Dirichlet–Jordan test for Fourier series

Moreover, if  is continuous everywhere, then the convergence is uniform.

Stated in terms of a periodic function of period 2π, the Fourier series coefficients are defined as

and the partial sums of the Fourier series are

The analogous statement holds irrespective of what the period of f is, or which version of the Fourier series is chosen.

Jordan test for Fourier integrals 
For the Fourier transform on the real line, there is a version of the test as well. Then

This version of the test (although not satisfying modern demands for rigor) is historically prior to Dirichlet, being due to Joseph Fourier.

Dirichlet conditions in signal processing 
In signal processing, the test is often retained in the original form due to Dirichlet: a piecewise monotone bounded periodic function  has a convergent Fourier series whose value at each point is the arithmetic mean of the left and right limits of the function.  The condition of piecewise montonicity is equivalent to having only finitely many local extrema, i.e., that the function changes its variation only finitely many times.  (Dirichlet required in addition that the function have only finitely many discontinuities, but this constraint is unnecessarily stringent.)  Any signal that can be physically produced in a laboratory satisfies these conditions.

As in the pointwise case of the Jordan test, the condition of boundedness can be relaxed if the function is assumed to be absolutely integrable (i.e.) over a period, provided it satisfies the other conditions of the test in a neighborhood of the point  where the limit is taken.

Dirichlet conditions for Fourier series
A set of Dirichlet conditions, for the covergence of Fourier series of a periodic function , are:
Function  is absolutely integrable over a period.
Function  has bounded variation over one time period. The functions with bounded variations can have (i) at most a countably infinite number of maxima and minima, and (ii) at most a countably infinite number of finite discontinuities.

Dirichlet conditions for Fourier transform
If the period of a periodic signal tends to infinity then Fourier series becomes Fourier transform. Fourier transforms of periodic (e.g., sine and cosine) functions also exist in the distributional sense which can be expressed using the Dirac delta function.
A set of Dirichlet conditions, for the covergence of Fourier transform of an aperiodic function , are:
Function  is absolutely integrable over the entire duration of time.
Function  has bounded variation over the entire duration of time. The functions with bounded variations can contain (i) at most a countably infinite number of maxima and minima, and (ii) at most a countably infinite number of finite discontinuities.

See also
 Dini test

References

External links

Fourier series
Theorems in analysis